= Grupo Puma =

Construction company group

Grupo Puma is a group of companies specialised in construction materials. It has a production capacity of about one million tonnes per year.

Grupo Puma has 37 production and distribution centres in four continents, including locations in Spain, Portugal, France, Algeria, Morocco, Costa Rica, Colombia, India, and UAE. These facilities are equipped with advanced technology to support the company's product range and service coverage.
